Mana Kawamura was the defending champion but chose not to participate.

Panna Udvardy won the title, defeating Elina Avanesyan in the final, 6–2, 6–0.

Seeds

Draw

Finals

Top half

Bottom half

References

External Links
Main Draw

Internazionali di Tennis del Friuli Venezia Giulia - Singles
2022 Women's Singles